166P/NEAT is a periodic comet and centaur in the outer Solar System. It was discovered by the Near Earth Asteroid Tracking (NEAT) project in 2001 and initially classified a comet with provisional designation P/2001 T4 (NEAT), as it was apparent from the discovery observations that the body exhibited a cometary coma. It is one of few known bodies with centaur-like orbits that display a coma, along with 60558 Echeclus, 2060 Chiron, 165P/LINEAR and 167P/CINEOS. It is also one of the reddest centaurs.

166P/NEAT has a perihelion distance of 8.56 AU, and is a Chiron-type comet with (TJupiter > 3; a > aJupiter).

References

External links 
 Orbital simulation from JPL (Java) / Ephemeris
 166P on Seiichi Yoshida's comet list

Chiron-type comets
Periodic comets
0166

20011015